The Rameeza Bee rape case (1978) is a controversial case in Hyderabad, India. Ms. Bee claimed that she was raped by four police officers inside the Nallakunta police station, after she accused her husband of beating her. The accusations caused widespread rioting within Hyderabad. Trouble sparked off after the alleged rape of Rameeza Bee by police and the murder of her husband, Ahmed Hussain. Police opened fire at 11 places in a single day, and the old city was placed under curfew for 50 days in three bouts. From then on curfew became a regular feature in Hyderabad. After a gap of six years the city witnessed communal violence during September 1984 when the Ganesh festival was celebrated amidst a political crisis triggered by Nadendla Bhaskara Rao toppling the democratically elected N. T. Rama Rao Government. For the first time the entire twin cities of Hyderabad and Secunderabad were placed under curfew.

References

External links 
http://timesofindia.indiatimes.com/city/hyderabad/Clashes-between-communities-a-recent-history/articleshow/358583.cms

Gang rape in India
Police brutality in India
History of Hyderabad, India
1978 crimes in India
Incidents of violence against women
Violence against women in India